Cook Islands will compete at the 2011 World Aquatics Championships in Shanghai, China between July 16 and 31, 2011.

Open water swimming

Men

Swimming

Cook Islands qualified 2 swimmers.

Men

Women

References

Nations at the 2011 World Aquatics Championships
2011 in Cook Islands sport
Cook Islands at the World Aquatics Championships